The Christensen failure criterion is a material failure theory for isotropic materials that attempts to span the range from ductile to brittle materials.  It has a two-property form calibrated by the uniaxial tensile and compressive strengths T  and C .

The theory was developed by Stanford professor Richard. M. Christensen and first published in 1997.

Description
The Christensen failure criterion is composed of two separate subcriteria representing competitive failure mechanisms. when expressed in principal stress components, it is given by :

Polynomial invariants failure criterion

For      

Coordinated Fracture Criterion

For      

The fracture criterion (applicable only over the partial range 0 ≤ T/C ≤ 1/2  ) cuts slices off the paraboloid, leaving three flattened elliptical surfaces on it. The fracture cutoff is vanishingly small at T/C=1/2 but it grows progressively larger as T/C diminishes.

The organizing principle underlying the theory is that all isotropic materials admit a distinct classification system based upon their T/C ratio. The comprehensive failure criterion and  reduces to the Mises criterion at the ductile limit, T/C = 1. At the brittle limit, T/C = 0, it reduces to a form that cannot sustain any tensile components of stress.

Many cases of verification have been examined over the complete range of materials from extremely ductile to extremely brittle types. Also, examples of applications have been given. Related criteria distinguishing ductile from brittle failure behaviors have been derived and interpreted.

Applications have been given by Ha to the failure of the isotropic, polymeric matrix phase in fiber composite materials.

See also 
 Strength of materials
 material failure theory
 Von Mises yield criterion
 Mohr–Coulomb theory

References 

Mechanical failure
Plasticity (physics)
Solid mechanics
Mechanics